Thomas Wynns (1764June 3, 1825) was an American United States Congressman from Hertford County, North Carolina. He was an original member of the University of North Carolina at Chapel Hill Board of Trustees. He is interred near Winton, North Carolina, which is named for his father Benjamin.

Wynns owned slaves.

See also 

 Seventh United States Congress
 Eighth United States Congress
 Ninth United States Congress

References

1764 births
1825 deaths
People from Hertford County, North Carolina
Democratic-Republican Party members of the United States House of Representatives from North Carolina
19th-century American politicians